The 21st Panzer Brigade "Lipperland" (abbreviated to: PzBrig 21) is a brigade in the German Army and part of the Bundeswehr. The brigade staff and most of its units are based at the Field Marshal Rommel Barracks in Augustdorf, North Rhine-Westphalia. Several companies are based in Glückauf Barracks in Unna-Königsborn.

The roughly 4,100 strong brigade is one of the Army's reaction forces and, like  the Panzerlehrbrigade 9 and Panzergrenadierbrigade 41, is subordinate to the 1st Panzer Division headquartered in Hanover.

21st Panzer Brigade was formed in 1957 as Combat Group (Panzerkampfgruppe) C3 in the 3rd Panzer Division and, from 1959 to 2006, was assigned to the 7th Panzer Division. The Brigade carries the honorific title "Lipperland" as it is stationed in the Lippe area.

Structure May 2020 

  21st Panzer Brigade (Panzerbrigade 21), in Augustdorf
  Staff and Signal Company 21st Panzer Brigade, in Augustdorf
  7th Reconnaissance Battalion (Aufklärungsbataillon 7), in Ahlen with Fennek reconnaissance vehicles and KZO drones
  1st Jäger Battalion (Jägerbataillon 1), Schwarzenborn with GTK Boxer armoured personnel carriers
  203rd Panzer Battalion (Panzerbataillon 203), in Augustdorf with 44x Leopard 2A7 main battle tanks
  212th Panzergrenadier Battalion (Panzergrenadierbataillon 212), in Augustdorf with 44x Puma infantry fighting vehicles
  921st Jäger Battalion (Jägerbataillon 921), in Schwarzenborn (Reserve unit)
  1st Panzer Engineer Battalion (Panzerpionierbataillon 1), in Holzminden
  7th Supply Battalion (Versorgungsbataillon 7), in Unna

References

Sources

External links 

 

21
North Rhine-Westphalia
1957 establishments in West Germany
Military units and formations established in 1957